MSFC stands for:

In sport:
Mamelodi Sundowns F.C.
Metropolitan Sports Facilities Commission
Michigan Stars FC
Mickleover Sports F.C.
Moroka Swallows F.C.
Munster Senior Football Championship

In other uses:

Marshall Space Flight Center, NASA
Melbourne Science Fiction Club
Multilayer switch Feature Card
Maharashtra State Financial Corporation